Jim Sweeney (born 8 August 1956) is a Scottish actor. Over the years, Sweeney has starred in a variety of productions for both film and television. Starting with a small role in River City, he later went on to play Mick Turner in The Crews opposite actors such as David Hayman. In film he has appeared in The Angels Share and The Wee Man as well as a variety of short films. In 2013, he took part in a tribute video to Quentin Tarintino's Reservoir Dogs to mark the 21st birthday of the film. The film recreated the opening scene of the original picture with Sweeney playing the role of Joe Cabot. The film was shot in Glasgow and was directed by Colin Ross Smith. Recently, Sweeney has starred in the starred in the Outlander television series and the short film The Groundsman, which was nominated for the 'Best Fiction' accolade at the 2014 British Academy Scotland New Talent Awards.

Filmography

Awards

See also
The Groundsman

References

External links

Jim Sweeney Homepage
Jim Sweeney Spotlight Profile

Living people
1956 births
Scottish male film actors